Miss Universe 2004 was the 53rd Miss Universe pageant, held at the Centro de Convenciones CEMEXPO in Quito, Ecuador on June 1, 2004.

At the end of the event, Amelia Vega of the Dominican Republic crowned Jennifer Hawkins of Australia as Miss Universe 2005. It is Australia's first victory in 32 years, and the second victory in the pageant's history.

Contestants from 80 contestants competed in this year's pageant. The competition was hosted by Billy Bush and Daisy Fuentes. Cuban-American singer and songwriter Gloria Estefan performed in this year's pageant.

Background

Location and date 
Quito, Ecuador was announced as host city of the pageant on August 19, 2003. The city paid $5 million for the right to host the event, although it anticipated recouping this through visitors and promotion of the country during the televised competition.

In March, Ecuador's foreign trade minister was forced to reject rumours that the pageant was at risk of being moved to China, and he urged Ecuadoreans to back the pageant. As an added incentive for tourists, American Airlines, official airline sponsor of the pageant, offered 5% off airfares to Quito for travel to the pageant, as well as 10% off for those who booked a month in advance. The attempted use of the pageant to promote Ecuador threatened to be derailed just prior to the telecast, when a corruption scandal led to growing demands for the removal of President Lucio Gutierrez in the politically unstable country.

Prior to the arrival of delegates in early May, officials in Quito attempted to renovate areas where they would be visiting, which involved temporarily removing beggars and homeless people from certain areas of the city. Similar action was taken in Bangkok, Thailand prior to Miss Universe 1992 and in Manila, Philippines prior to Miss Universe 1994. The event was protested by native Indian activists and environmentalists who accused the government of concealing the nations poverty whilst the pageant was being hosted.

The delegates, judges, media and tourists were heavily protected by a security detail involving over 5000 police officers. On May 16, just hours before delegates were expected to participate in a parade in Cuenca, a pamphlet bomb was deactivated by police. Although it was protesting the economic policies of the Ecuadorian government, police suspected that the bomb, found just six blocks from the parade route, was timed specifically to coincide with the event.

Selection of participants 
Contestants from 80 countries and territories were selected to compete in the pageant. Two delegates were appointees to their position to replace the original dethroned winner.

Zita Galgociova was initially chosen to represent Slovak Republic, but she was replaced with her first runner-up Zuzana Dvorska because she was under the minimum age. Miss Hanoi-Vietnam 2003 Nguyễn Thị Hồng Vân was chosen to represent Vietnam, but she was replaced by the gold medal winner of Vietnam Supermodel Award 2004 Hoàng Khánh Ngọc with unknown reasons.

The 2004 edition saw the debuts of Ethiopia, Georgia, and Vietnam, and the returns of Austria, Botswana, Chile, Denmark, Ghana, Kenya, Lebanon, Paraguay, Saint Vincent and the Grenadines, Turks and Caicos, and Uruguay. Saint Vincent and the Grenadines last competed in 1991, Austria in 1999, Denmark in 2000, Botswana, Turks and Caicos, Lebanon, and Paraguay in 2001, while the others last competed in 2002. Albania, Argentina, Mauritius, Namibia, and New Zealand withdrew. Sabine Bourdet of Mauritius withdrew due to health problems, while Petrina Thomas of Namibia withdrew due to lack of sponsorship. Albania, Argentina, and New Zealand withdrew after their respective organizations failed to hold a national competition or appoint a delegate.

Maria José Girol Jimenez was set to compete at Miss Universe. However, Jimenez withdrew due to the lack of sponsorship. Dian Krishna, Puteri Indonesia 2003, was welcomed by the pageant organizers and was given the chance to attend the show in the audience as an observer. Ragnhildur Steinunn Jónsdóttir of Iceland was also set to compete at Miss Universe, but withdrew due to undisclosed reasons.

Results

Placements

Special awards

Pageant

Format 
Same with 2003, 15 semifinalists were chosen through the preliminary competition— composed of the swimsuit and evening gown competitions and closed-door interviews. The top 15 competed in the evening gown and were narrowed down to the top 10 afterward. The top 10 competed in the swimsuit competition and were narrowed down to the top 5 afterward. The top 5 competed in the question and answer round and the final look.

Selection committee

Final telecast 
 Bo Derek – Film actress 
 Bill Rancic – Winner of the first season of The Apprentice
 Katie Pritz  – Today Show's "You Be The Judge" contest winner
 Wendy Fitzwilliam – Miss Universe 1998 from Trinidad and Tobago
 Elsa Benítez – International supermodel
 Jon Tutolo – President of Trump Model Management
 Anne Martin – Vice President of Global Cosmetics and Marketing of Procter & Gamble Cosmetics
 Monique Menniken – Supermodel
 Petra Nemcova – Sports Illustrated supermodel
 Jefferson Pérez – 1996 Ecuadorian Olympic gold medalist
 Emilio Estefan – Music producer and entertainer

Note: Kwame Jackson, runner-up on the first season of The Apprentice, was initially chosen as a judge, but he was disqualified because he inadvertently visited the hotel where the delegates were staying and interacted with some of the contestants.

Contestants 
80 contestants competed for the title.

Notes

References

External links
 Official website

2004
2004 in Ecuador
2004 beauty pageants
Beauty pageants in Ecuador
Events in Quito
June 2004 events in South America